Blageddy Stream is a small brook in Slater Park in Pawtucket, Rhode Island. It connects the Slater Park Duck Pond, Friendship Gardens Pond, and the Blageddy Swamp to the Ten Mile River. Originally, the Blaggeddy Stream was a much larger Swamp before the creation of the park. The water that was there was routed into a narrow channel, which is the Blageddy Stream that is there today. The brook is formed by two channels. One flows north out of Friendship Gardens. The other flows south out of the Blaggeddy Swamp. They meet in a culvert and enter the Duck Pond, before flowing east into the Ten Mile River.

References
maps from the United States Geological Survey.

Rivers of Providence County, Rhode Island
Rivers of Rhode Island